A knez or kenez ( or ; ;) was the hereditary leader of the Vlach (Romanian) communities in the Kingdom of Hungary and western Balkans, during the Middle Ages.

Terminology
In the medieval Kingdom of Hungary, official documents, written in Latin, applied multiple terms when they mentioned the Vlach leaders (or chiefs) in the Kingdom of Hungary in the 13th and 14th centuries. The most widely used termskenezius and its variantsderived from the Slavic knyaz ("ruler"). The office was closely associated with communities living according to the "Vlach law", thus the term knez was replaced by the term scultetus in the northeastern regions, where German law prevailed. A territory subjected to the authority of a knez was known as keneziatus (or keneziate). Several keneziates formed a voivodate, which was subjected to a higher official, the voivode.

In the western parts of the medieval Balkans, knez was one of the terms used to refer to the leader of a Vlach katun, alongside katunar and other titles. In the 14th century and especially after the beginning of the 15th century, the term knez became more and more frequent in historical sources of the western Balkans, where it also referred to the leader of several katuns. The knez was then responsible for the social order of his community, and acted as an intermediary between his people and the higher states of the feudal state of which his katun was part.

See also
 Knyaz
 Katun (community)

References

Sources

 
 
 
 

Conditional nobility (Kingdom of Hungary)
Medieval Romania